Roger Lambrecht (19 August 1931 – 15 February 2022) was a Belgian businessman and footballer. From 1994 to 2019, he was President of Sporting Lokeren.

Biography
Lambrecht made his football debut during World War II with Standaard FC Lokeren. Upon his retirement, he began working in a Michelin factory.

In the 1960s, Lambrecht founded his own tire manufacturing plant in Berchem, located just outside of Antwerp. In 1993, he became managing director of the newly founded airline VLM Airlines. One year later, he took over Sporting Lokeren, which had just been relegated to the Belgian Second Division. He brought the club back to Belgian First Division A in 1996. He then devoted himself to the club full-time and left VLM Airlines in 1997.

Lambrecht was the sole decision-maker for Sporting Lokeren until 2010. He decided to delegate some functions of the club to technical director Willy Verhoost and sporting manager Jean-Marie Philips, the latter of whom was replaced the following year by Marc Vanmaele. The club subsequently won the Belgian Cup in 2012 and 2014. On 7 June 2019, Lambrecht stepped down as President of Sporting Lokeren and left the club's leadership with former player agent Louis de Vries.

He died on 15 February 2022, at the age of 90.

References

1931 births
2022 deaths
People from Lokeren
Belgian businesspeople
K.S.C. Lokeren Oost-Vlaanderen
Belgian football managers
Belgian chief executives